Bishambhar Nath Sanatan Dharam Inter College is an intermediate college in Chunniganj, Kanpur, India. It educates students up to class XII. It  was founded in 1939. The college provides education in Science, Commerce, Arts and other subjects. Siddha Nath Gupta (S.N. Gupta) is the principal and is in office from 1 April 2022.

It is named after Rai Bhadur Bishambhar Nath who was an industrialist, banner, freedom fighter and social worker.  He devoted his life to the cause of national integration, and to the spread of the Gandhian way of life.

Notable alumni
David Dhawan (film Maker)
Salil Vishnoi (MLA Kanpur)
Harish-Chandra (mathematician, fundamental work in representation theory, especially Harmonic analysis on semisimple Lie groups. From 1968, until his death in 1983, he was IBM von Neumann Professor in the School of Mathematics at the Institute for Advanced Study, Princeton.)
 Ram Nath Kovind (President of India)

References

High schools and secondary schools in Uttar Pradesh
Intermediate colleges in Uttar Pradesh
Schools in Kanpur
Educational institutions established in 1939
1939 establishments in India